Bjørn Bjørnseth (28 August 1888 – 1 September 1976) was a Norwegian equestrian. He competed at the 1920 Summer Olympics and the 1936 Summer Olympics.

References

1888 births
1976 deaths
Norwegian male equestrians
Olympic equestrians of Norway
Equestrians at the 1920 Summer Olympics
Equestrians at the 1936 Summer Olympics
Sportspeople from Oslo
20th-century Norwegian people